Wanna may refer to:
Places
Wanna, Pakistan, a city in South Waziristan, Pakistan
Wanna, Germany
Other
Wanna (Dune), a minor character from Frank Herbert's novel Dune
"Wanna" (song), a single by Korean girl group Kara.
Relaxed pronunciation of "want to" or "want a"